Chinatown Nights is a 1938 British science fiction film directed by Toni Frenguelli and starring Harry Agar Lyons (his last film), Anne Grey and Robert Hobbs. Lyons plays an evil Asian character named Dr. Sin Fang, a character that he had played earlier in a 1928 six-picture film series produced by Pioneer Productions (see  the actor’s filmography).

Cast
 Harry Agar Lyons - Doctor Sin Fang 
 Anne Grey - Sonia Graham 
 Robert Hobbs - John Byrne 
 Nell Emerald - Mrs. Higgins 
 Arty Ash - Professor Graham  
 George Mozart - Bill

References

External links

1938 films
British black-and-white films
British science fiction films
1930s science fiction films
1930s English-language films
1930s British films